Jay Paul Mortenson (born September 26, 1966) is an American former competition swimmer and Olympic gold medalist.  He earned a gold medal by swimming for the winning U.S. team in the preliminary heats of the men's 4×100-meter medley relay at the 1988 Summer Olympics in Seoul, South Korea.  He also finished sixth in the final of the men's 100-meter butterfly, and eleventh overall in the B Final of the men's 100-meter backstroke.

See also
 List of Olympic medalists in swimming (men)
 List of Stanford University people

References

1966 births
Living people
American male backstroke swimmers
American male butterfly swimmers
Stanford Cardinal men's swimmers
Swimmers at the 1988 Summer Olympics
Place of birth missing (living people)
Medalists at the 1988 Summer Olympics
Olympic gold medalists for the United States in swimming
Universiade medalists in swimming
Universiade gold medalists for the United States
Universiade bronze medalists for the United States
Medalists at the 1987 Summer Universiade
20th-century American people
21st-century American people